The following is a partial list of forts and castles in Pakistan:

See also 
 Tourism in Pakistan
 List of UNESCO World Heritage Sites in Pakistan
 List of museums in Pakistan
 Lahore Fort
 Rohtas Fort
 Noor Mahal
 Derawar Fort

References

External links 

Forts of Pakistan by Shaikh Muhammad Ali

Pakistan
Forts
Forts